The 2012 Asian Junior Badminton Championships is an Asia continental junior championships to crown the best U-19 badminton players across Asia. It was held in Gimcheon Indoor Stadium, Gimcheon, South Korea from June 30 to July 7, 2012.

Tournament
The 2013 Asian Junior Badminton Championships organized by the Gyeongbuk Badminton Association, Badminton Korea Association, and Badminton Asia Confederation. The motto of this tournament is "Peace of Asia through shuttlecock". This tournament consists of mixed team competition, which was held from  30 June–3 July, as well as five individual events started from 3–7 July. More than 250 athletes from 20 countries participated in this tournament.

Venue
This tournament was held at Gimcheon Indoor Stadium in Gimcheon, Gyeongbuk, South Korea.

Medalists
In the mixed team event, Japan claim the title for the first time after defeat China with the score 3–0. In the individuals event, South Korea ensure two titles after won the mixed and girls' doubles event. Japan, India, and Indonesia seize a title by winning the boys' singles, girls' singles and boys' doubles events respectively.

Medal table

References

External links 
Team Event at Tournamentsoftware.com
Individual Event at Tournamentsoftware.com

 
Badminton Asia Junior Championships
Asian Junior Badminton Championships
Asian Junior Badminton Championships
Sport in Gimcheon
2012 in youth sport
2012 in South Korean sport
Bad
Bad